Comprehensive Capital Analysis and Review (CCAR) is a United States regulatory framework introduced by the Federal Reserve in 2009 to assess, regulate, and supervise large banks and financial institutions – collectively referred to in the framework as bank holding companies (BHCs). It was an extension of the stress tests performed during the Financial crisis of 2007–2008.

The assessment is conducted annually and comprises two related programs:

 Comprehensive Capital Analysis and Review
 Dodd–Frank Act supervisory stress testing

The core part of the program assesses whether:
 BHCs possess adequate capital. 
 The capital structure is stable given various stress-test scenarios.
 Planned capital distributions, such as dividends and share repurchases, are viable and acceptable in relation to regulatory minimum capital requirements. 

The assessment is performed on both qualitative and quantitative bases. The Federal Reserve may order banks to suspend their planned capital distributions to shareholders until the target capital balance is restored.

Dodd–Frank Act supervisory stress testing

Dodd–Frank Act imposes forward-looking stress testing of a bank's capital structure on a quantitative basis. The annual stress-test scenarios are prescribed by the regulatory body, while the mid-cycle testing may be performed under discretionary scenarios.

The Federal Reserve publishes three scenarios which each BHC must model: baseline, adverse, and severely adverse. These scenarios contain numeric values of macroeconomic indicators describing potential global economic scenarios two years (nine quarters) into the future. According to the Federal Reserve, each scenario represents the following: 

The BHCs are also asked to design their own scenarios to ensure capital adequacy.

The Federal Reserve publishes a summary of each year's results.

See also
 Stress test (financial)
 Capital requirement
 Too big to fail
 Systemic risk

References

External links
 Information on the FED website
 Key Points from the 2015 CCAR
 PwC Financial Services Risk and Regulatory Practice: 2016 CCAR Results

United States federal banking legislation
Stress tests (financial)
Consumer Financial Protection Bureau
Insurance in the United States
2010 in American law
2010 in economics